Sherwood B. Idso (born June 12, 1942) is the president of the Center for the Study of Carbon Dioxide and Global Change, which rejects the scientific consensus on climate change. Previously he was a Research Physicist with the U.S. Department of Agriculture's Agricultural Research Service at the U.S. Water Conservation Laboratory in Phoenix, Arizona, where he worked since June 1967. He was also closely associated with Arizona State University over most of this period, serving as an adjunct professor in the Departments of Geology, Geography, and Botany and Microbiology. His two sons, Craig and Keith, are, respectively, the founder and vice president of the Center for the Study of Carbon Dioxide and Global Change.

Idso is the author or co-author of over 500 publications including the books Carbon Dioxide: Friend or Foe? (1982) and Carbon Dioxide and Global Change: Earth in Transition (1989). He served on the editorial board of the international journal Agricultural and Forest Meteorology from 1973 to 1993 and since 1993 has served on the editorial board of Environmental and Experimental Botany.  Over the course of his career, he has been an invited reviewer of manuscripts for 56 different scientific journals and 17 different funding agencies, representing an unusually large array of disciplines. He is an ISI highly cited researcher.

Early life and education
Sherwood Idso was born in Thief River Falls, Minnesota on June 12, 1942, where he lived until graduating from high school in 1960. Idso then attended the Institute of Technology at the University of Minnesota, receiving a B.Phys. in Physics with distinction in 1964, followed by an M.S. in Soil Science (with a minor in Physics) in 1966 and then a Ph.D. in Soil Science (with a minor in Meteorology and Mechanical Engineering) in 1968. His doctoral thesis was titled, The photosynthetic response of plants to their environment: a holocoenotic method of analysis.

Climate science
In 1972, Idso published an article called "An American Haboob", in which he documented a large dust storm in Arizona which occurred on July 16, 1971, and which stretched from Tucson to Phoenix.

In 1980, Idso published research which concluded that climate sensitivity was probably only about 0.3 °C. The following year, he criticized NASA's global warming predictions, saying they were "about 10 times too great," adding that, in his view, global warming would have a beneficial effect on agriculture.

In 1984, Idso, along with A.J. Brazel, published a study in Nature which concluded, contrary to a report the National Academy of Sciences released the previous year, that rising CO2 levels would increase streamflow. The study's authors argued that the NAS report came to the opposite conclusion because it neglected the effect of rising CO2 levels on plants.

In the 1997 book, Global Warming: The Science and the Politics Idso said: "I find no compelling reason to believe that the earth will necessarily experience any global warming as a consequence of the ongoing rise in the atmosphere's carbon dioxide concentration."

Awards
 1977 - Arthur S. Flemming Award in recognition of "his innovative research into fundamental aspects of agricultural-climatological interrelationships affecting food production and the identification of achievable research goals whose attainment could significantly aid in assessment and improvement of world food supplies."
 2003 - Petr Beckmann Award for "courage and achievement in defense of scientific truth and freedom."
 2014 - Frederick Seitz Memorial Award (presented by Heartland Institute)

Selected publications

References

External links
 CO2 Science
 
 , Doctors for Disaster Preparedness Meeting, July 12, 2003

1942 births
Living people
University of Minnesota College of Science and Engineering alumni
American climatologists
People from Thief River Falls, Minnesota